Jeff Williams (born July 14, 1986) is an American poker player from Dunwoody, Georgia. He graduated from Dunwoody High and the University of Georgia.

In March 2006, Williams won the European Poker Tour (EPT) second season Monte Carlo Grand Final where he won €900,000 (US$1,084,037). Jeff was only 19 at the time of his victory. Jeff qualified for the tournament at PokerStars where he plays under the name "yellowsub86".

In the 2008 World Series of Poker Williams finished second in the $1,000 no-limit hold 'em rebuy for $406,330.

As of 2011, his total live tournament winnings exceed $1,900,000.

Top Winnings

References

American poker players
European Poker Tour winners
Living people
1986 births
University of Georgia people
Dunwoody High School alumni